Antinephele muscosa is a moth of the family Sphingidae. It is found from Ghana to Gabon.

The abdomen is bright blue-green dorsally. The forewing upperside is generally mid-brown and the area between the basal and antemedian bands is pale brown. The median area is usually mid-brown but sometimes pale brown.

References

Antinephele
Moths described in 1889
Insects of the Democratic Republic of the Congo
Insects of West Africa
Fauna of Gabon
Moths of Africa